Książ Śląski is a village in the administrative district of Gmina Kożuchów, within Nowa Sól County, Lubusz Voivodeship, in western Poland.

The village has a population of 340.

References

Villages in Nowa Sól County